Merima Hashim (born 1981 in Lekemj) is an Ethiopian long-distance runner who started competing internationally in the late 1990s mainly in the 10000 metres and half marathon distances.

In 1999 she won a silver medal for the 10000 metres in the All-Africa Games in Johannesburg, South Africa

External links

1981 births
Living people
Ethiopian female long-distance runners
African Games silver medalists for Ethiopia
African Games medalists in athletics (track and field)
Athletes (track and field) at the 1999 All-Africa Games
20th-century Ethiopian women
21st-century Ethiopian women